Harald Quandt (1 November 1921 – 22 September 1967) was a German industrialist, the son of industrialist Günther Quandt and Magda Behrend Rietschel. His parents divorced and his mother was later married to Joseph Goebbels. After World War II, Quandt and his older half-brother Herbert Quandt ran the industrial empire left to them by their father and which continues today—with the family's owning a stake in Germany's luxury car manufacturer BMW.

Early life

Harald Quandt was born in Charlottenburg, son of industrialist Günther Quandt and Magdalena Behrend Rietschel who had married in 1921. Although the couple divorced in 1929, they remained on friendly terms. Magda later married Joseph Goebbels at a property owned by Günther Quandt. Adolf Hitler was Goebbels' best man.

After his mother's marriage, Quandt remained with his father, who became a prominent business leader in Nazi Germany. Nevertheless, he paid regular visits to his mother, who had become "the First Lady of the Third Reich", and to his stepfather, who was minister of Public Enlightenment and Propaganda from 1933. After 1934, he returned to his mother and lived with the Goebbels family until passing his school-leaving examination in 1940. Residing with his adopted family, he raised several eyebrows by supporting the sloganeering of the Indian politician Subhas Chandra Bose.

Quandt served as a lieutenant in the Luftwaffe during World War II. He took part in the Battle of Crete in 1941 and later fought in Russia and Italy, where he was injured. In 1944, he was captured by Allied troops in Italy; he was released in 1947. Magda and Joseph Goebbels committed suicide after killing their six children on 1 May 1945. Harald was the only one of Magda's children to survive.

Post-war
Quandt married Inge Bandekow (1928–1978), who was the daughter of the company's lawyer and worked as a secretary with her father, at the beginning of the 1950s. In the following 17 years, the couple had five daughters: Katarina Geller (1951), Gabriele Quandt-Langenscheidt (1952), Anette May-Thies (1954), Colleen-Bettina Rosenblat-Mo (1962) and Patricia Halterman (1967–2005). Quandt had the reputation of being a “committed playboy".

Business dealings
After returning to Germany, Quandt first assisted his half-brother in re-building the family firms, and then from 1949 to 1953 studied mechanical engineering in Hanover and Stuttgart, where his family owned large firms (AFA/VARTA in Hanover, a private equity firm in Stuttgart).

Quandt's father died in 1954, leaving his empire jointly to Herbert and Harald, and making Harald one of the wealthiest men in West Germany. By then, the Quandt group consisted of more than 200 companies, ranging from the original textile businesses to pharmaceutical company Altana AG. The family holdings also included large stakes in the German auto industry with nearly 10% of Daimler-Benz and 30% of BMW. Although Herbert and Harald jointly managed the companies, Herbert focused on AFA/VARTA and the automotive investments, while Harald was in charge of IWKA and the engineering and tooling companies. Harald was an enthusiast of the amphibious vehicle known as the Amphicar that was manufactured by IWKA. His death was a factor in the ceasing of production of the Amphicar.

Death
Quandt survived an aviation accident at Zurich Airport on 12 December 1965, but he was killed when another of his aircraft crashed in Cuneo, Italy, on 22 September 1967.

Family inheritance
Harald Quandt's five daughters inherited about DM1.5 billion (US$760 million, €585 million) and later increased their wealth through the Harald Quandt Holding GmbH, a German-based family investment company and trust. By 2022, the family office reports they share a fortune worth at least US$17 billion.

In popular culture
The Hanns-Joachim-Friedrichs-Award winning documentary film The Silence of the Quandts by the German public broadcaster ARD described in October 2007 the role of the Quandt family businesses during the Second World War. The family's Nazi past was previously not well known, and the documentary film revealed it to a wide audience and confronted the Quandts about the use of forced labour in the family's factories during World War II. As a result, five days after the showing, four family members announced, on behalf of the entire Quandt family, their intention to fund a research project in which a historian will examine the family's activities during Adolf Hitler's dictatorship. The independent 1,200-page study released in 2011 concluded that, "The Quandts were linked inseparably with the crimes of the Nazis", according to Joachim Scholtyseck, the historian who compiled and researched the study.

See also
 Secret Meeting of 20 February 1933

References

Further reading

 ,

External links
 The Silence of the Quandts - 

German people of Dutch descent
1921 births
1967 deaths
Aviators killed in aviation accidents or incidents in Italy
Businesspeople from Berlin
20th-century German businesspeople
German industrialists
Fallschirmjäger of World War II
German prisoners of war in World War II held by the United Kingdom
Harald
Victims of aviation accidents or incidents in Italy
Victims of aviation accidents or incidents in 1967
Goebbels family